The 2015–16 Iowa Hawkeyes women's basketball team will represent University of Iowa during the 2015–16 NCAA Division I women's basketball season. The Hawkeyes, led by sixteenth year head coach Lisa Bluder, play their home games at the Carver–Hawkeye Arena and were a members of the Big Ten Conference. They finished the season 19–14, 8–10 in Big Ten play to finish in a tie for ninth place. They advanced to the quarterfinals of the Big Ten women's tournament where they lost to Maryland. They were invited to the Women's National Invitation Tournament where they lost to Ball State in the first round.

Roster

Schedule

|-
! colspan="9" style="background:#000; color:#fc0;"| Exhibition

|-
! colspan="9" style="background:#000; color:#fc0;"| Non-conference regular season

|-
! colspan="9" style="background:#000; color:#fc0;"| Big Ten regular season

|-
! colspan="9" style="background:#000; color:#fc0;"| Big Ten Conference Women's Tournament

|-
! colspan="9" style="background:#000; color:#fc0;"| WNIT

See also
2015–16 Iowa Hawkeyes men's basketball team

Rankings

References

Iowa Hawkeyes women's basketball seasons
Iowa
2016 Women's National Invitation Tournament participants
Iowa Hawkeyes
Iowa Hawkeyes